Neal Purvis (born 9 September 1961) and Robert Wade (born 1962) are screenwriters who co-wrote the seven James Bond films from 1999's The World Is Not Enough to 2021's No Time to Die, as well as other works.

Early lives
Purvis's father was a photographer, and as a teenager, Purvis was in a film club that focused on 1940s cinema.

Wade was born in Penarth and lived there until he was 11. His mother was an artist, and from an early age he wanted to be a writer and began making home-made films as a teenager.

They met each other while attending a university at the University of Kent, when they were assigned as roommates. They began playing in a band together, which they continued to do for at least 20 years. Purvis left Kent and completed a BA in Film and Photo Arts. Wade graduated from Kent and moved to London where he was later joined by Purvis. They spent six years writing scripts together as well as ghost writing for music videos.

Films
Wade and Purvis' screenplay for Let Him Have It (1991) (based on the true story of Derek Bentley, a young man who gets caught up in street gangs in post war London and is later controversially hanged), displayed the writers' "outrage toward a system hell-bent on vengeance" and was called "first rate, no non-sense".

Barbara Broccoli, producer of the James Bond films, hired Wade and Purvis to write their first Bond script because she had seen their film Plunkett & Macleane (1999) and liked that it was "dark, witty, sexy and inventive". Purvis described their approach when they joined the Bond franchise as to "come in with ideas, things we've found in science magazines, on the internet, interesting weapons and what's happening in technology. Then we find a journey for Bond to go through." In their Bond collaborations, Wade generally does "all the verbiage at the beginning of the script." They created a novelisation of their Bond script for The World Is Not Enough in collaboration with Raymond Benson. Wade and Purvis also wrote a script for a Bond spin-off featuring the Die Another Day character Jinx (Halle Berry), which was attached to director Stephen Frears, but cancelled by MGM because of budget concerns and "creative differences".

Their 2003 Bond parody, Johnny English, received generally unfavorable reviews from critics, receiving a 33% "rotten" rating at the review site Rotten Tomatoes. However, the film earned $160.5 million in its global box office receipts. A sequel, Johnny English Reborn, based upon their characters but written by Hamish McColl, was released in 2011.

Purvis and Wade wrote and produced Return to Sender (also known as Convicted), which was described as a "gripping tale" of a man "fighting to prevent a miscarriage of justice". They had originally written the script while doing research for their first film 14 years earlier.

In 2005, they co-authored the bio-pic Stoned (also known as The Wild and Wycked World of Brian Jones) about the last days of the life of The Rolling Stones co-founder, Brian Jones, which they based on an account from a builder on the farm where Jones died, claiming that Jones' death was not accidental as recorded by the coroner. The film was criticised for "fail[ing] to convey what mattered about Jones artistically, what he contributed to music, why we should feel more than pity."

When Daniel Craig was signed on as the new Bond, Wade described their approach to screenwriting thus: "When you have an actor you play to his strengths ... He's got this great toughness to him but not an unthinking toughness. I think that's where the films will need to go." Their first work for Craig as Bond, Casino Royale, was nominated for a BAFTA Award for Best Adapted Screenplay, and received a Four Star review from Roger Ebert, who stated that the film "has the answers to all my complaints about the forty-five-year-old James Bond series, and some I hadn't even thought of." However, their followup Quantum of Solace, which was not based on any Ian Fleming work, was criticized because while having "the right ingredients: plenty of car, plane or boat chases ... spooks, vendettas, and turncoats", it lacked the "magic, and a decent plot."

Their screenplay for Skyfall, which they co-wrote with John Logan, was described by Frank DiGiacomo of Movieline as being "very wily" for having Bond experience a mid-life crisis. In 2012, it was announced that "after a tremendous run" with the Bond franchise, Wade and Purvis would not be involved in the 24th Bond film, which would be solo written by Logan. However, on 27 June 2014, it was announced that they were being brought on to polish the screenplay for the next film.

On 10 March 2017 it was reported that they were approached to write the script for No Time to Die. In July 2017, it was initially reported they would write the script, but in May 2018, EON announced that director Danny Boyle was instead working with his regular collaborator John Hodge on a new script. In September 2018, following Boyle's departure from the project, Purvis and Wade were re-hired to write a new script.

Family life
Wade and his wife live in West Sussex and have four children.

Filmography

Films
 Let Him Have It (1991)
 The Puppet Masters (1994) (Uncredited)
 An American Werewolf in Paris (1997) (Uncredited)
 Plunkett & Macleane (1999)
 The World Is Not Enough (1999)
 Die Another Day (2002)
 Johnny English (2003)
 Return to Sender (2004)
 Stoned (2005)
 Casino Royale (2006)
 Quantum of Solace (2008)
 Skyfall (2012)
 Spectre (2015)
 No Time to Die (2021)

Television

References

External links

Living people
20th-century English male writers
21st-century English male writers
British television writers
English television writers
English screenwriters
English male screenwriters
British male television writers
Screenwriting duos
Welsh screenwriters
Year of birth missing (living people)
Alumni of the University of Kent